{{Chembox
| Name = S,''S-Dimethyl dithiocarbonate
| IUPACName = S,S-Dimethyl dithiocarbonate
| SystematicName = S,S-Dimethyl carbonodithioate
| OtherNames = {{ubl|Bis(methylsulfanyl)methanone|Carbonodithioic acid S,S-dimethyl ester|Dithiocarbonic acid S,S-dimethyl ester|S,S-Dimethyl dithiocarbonate}}
| ImageFile = S,S'-Dimethyl dithiocarbonate.png
| ImageAlt = S,S'-Dimethyl dithiocarbonate molecule
| Section1 = 
| Section2 = 
| Section7       = 
| Section9       = 
}}S,S-Dimethyl dithiocarbonate is an organic compound with the chemical formula . It is a colorless liquid. It is a methyl ester of dithiocarbonic S,S-acid. It is a thioester (the prefix thio- means that an oxygen atom in the compound is replaced by a sulfur atom). It is an analog of dimethyl carbonate, where the two oxygen atoms from the  groups are replaced by sulfur atoms. In terms of the name of this thioester, it is derived from an esterification of dithiocarbonic S,S-acid with methanethiol.

Uses
S,S-Dimethyl dithiocarbonate is used as a dehydrating agent in chemistry and as a carbonylating agent. It can be used as a source of a methanethiolate.
[[Image:Alkanethiolation reaction.png|thumb|center|500px|Alkanethiolation reaction using S,''S-dimethyl dithiocarbonate, tetrabutylammonium bromide and aqueous solution of potassium hydroxide]]

Hazards and toxicityS,S-Dimethyl dithiocarbonate is a skin, eyes and respiratory system irritant, and can be absorbed into the body through the skin, causing damage to the body. It may cause damage to gastrointestinal system if it is swallowed.S,S-Dimethyl dithiocarbonate is combustible. Upon catching fire, irritating and toxic fumes and gases are released, like carbon monoxide (CO), carbon dioxide and sulfur dioxide. May react violently with strong oxidizing agents.

References 

Organosulfur compounds
Thiocarbonyl compounds